The Nicktoons Film Festival (also known as the Nicktoons Network Animation Festival) was an annual event that was created by producer Fred Seibert and produced for its first three years by his Frederator Studios.

The festival featured a selection of animated shorts (10 minutes and under) from around the world. Shorts selected for the festival had the chance to be aired on Nicktoons Network, online and to be showcased at a live event in Los Angeles in October. Several prizes were awarded each year. Animators under 18 years old were eligible to enter the Greater Creator Contest. The 2009 season was the final season of the festival.

Winners

2004 winners
 Grand Prize: Timmy's Lessons In Nature by Mark Simon and Travis Blaise

2005 winners
 Grand Prize: La Révolution des Crabes by Arthur DePins
 Producers' Choice: The Naive Man from Lolliland by J. G. Quintel (basis for Regular Show)
 Student Animator: The Naive Man from Lolliland by J. G. Quintel
 Viewers' Choice: Farm Force by Project Firefly

2006 winners
 Grand Prize: The Ballad of Sheep 13 by Kyle McQueen
 Producers' Choice: Super Scout by Amy Poehler (basis for The Mighty B!)
 Student Animator: Animation Test Pilot by Brad Kinley
 Viewers' Choice: Sinking Margot by Julie Bergman

2007 winners
 Grand Prize: Zoologic by Nicole Mitchell
 Grand Jury: Zoologic by Nicole Mitchell
 Producers' Choice: St. Laleeloo by Jiwook Kim
 Diversity Award: Feb. 18, 2005 by Javier Barboza
 Student Animator: Bare by Andy Lyon
 Viewers' Choice: After Oz' by Percy Kiyabu

Episodes

Season 1 (The Nicktoons Film Festival 2004)
 (81 short films in 12 episodes)

 Charlie & Chunk (Stop-frame, Clay animation)
 Timmy's Lessons in Nature (Traditional 2D)
 It Could Be Worse (Traditional 2D)
 Childhood Trauma #17 (CG animation, created in Softimage: XSI)
 Lucky Penny (Traditional 2D)
 The Manly Bee (Traditional 2D)
 Day Off the Dead (CG animation)
 April (Traditional 2D)
 The Thing with No Head (Traditional 2D)
 Rotting Hills: Clark's New Home (Animated in Flash)
 Jack & Jill (CG, animated in Alias' Maya Software)
 Attack of the Note Sheep (Traditional 2D, composited with live-action footage)
 At Wit's Vend (CG animation, completed in Alias' Maya software)
 The 9th Life of Sherman Phelps: Serenity Now (Animated in Flash)
 Boing Boing (CG using Alias' Maya software)
 Scout Says (Traditional 2D with digital color)
 Magnetism (Animated in Alias' Maya software with Adobe Photoshop and After Effects)
 Atomic Love (Traditional 2D with 3D elements)
 Birdon (CG animation)
 Ape Escape, Part I (CG animation)
 Winged Devices (CG animation)
 Miracle Koala: Belt for Punishment (Animated in Flash)
 Sucker (3D created in Alias' Maya software)
 Monkey Fuss (2D using Adobe Premier, Photoshop, and After Effects)
 Bert (CG with 2D textures)
 Heads, You Lose! (CG animation)
 Manbird (Animated from Flash to QuickTime)
 Monstories: Fine Diners (2D & 3D Mix)
 Interrogating Ernie (Stop-frame & CG animation)
 Hairy Affairs (CG animation)
 Lou & Costa: Burglar Welcome Mat (2D animation)
 Roy & Dog (CG animation)
 Thirsty (Pencil on Mark & Paper)
 Dia de Los Muertos (Stop-frame & CG animation)
 Skippy (Traditional 2D)
 The Not So Heroic Adventures of Sidekick: Dooms Day Dog (Animated in Flash)
 <ESC> (CG created in Hash Animation Master)
 A Rhinocervs (2D animation)
 Tell Me Not to Worry (CG, 2D, and Stop-frame)
 Happy Mania (Adobe PhotoShop and After Effects)
 Welcome To My Life (Pilot) (Hand-drawn 2D; remade as a pilot for Cartoon Network in 2015)
 Kactus Kid (Animated in Flash and Traditional 2D)
 Robot Family: The Slick Salesman (Digital 2D)
 Wingnut (CG animation)
 Medusa: Pilot (Stop-frame animation)
 Martini and Meatballs: Avery's Game (Animated in Flash)
 Gruesomenstein's Monsters: Freddie and the Yeti (Animated in Flash)
 PGi-13 (CG with 2D sequences)
 Hero: 108 (Animated in Flash; basis for the series on Cartoon Network)
 Josh W. Eats a Bug (Traditional animation)
 Zoya the Zebra (2D animation)
 Doggie Door (Traditional animation)
 Bottom of the 9th (CG animation created in Alias' Maya software)
 The Turn-Off (2D cut-out animation with a 3D character)
 It's My Turn (Animated in Pencil)
 Kenya (Animated in Flash)
 Coolman: Deep Sea Blues (Animated in Flash)
 Haina: A Concert (2D animation)
 Gumbusters (2D animation)
 Ape Escape, Part II (CG animation)
 The Wild Wild Circus Company: Fishy Memories (2D animation with 3D textures)
 Loco Melones (3D animated in SoftImage XSI)
 Playing Cricket (3D animated in Hash's Animation Master)
 Beach Booty (2D, edited in Adobe Premiere and After Effects)
 Fool Throttle (Animated in Flash)
 Monkey, Monkey (2D animation)
 Rustbuckets: The Last Rainforest (CG animation)
 Six Snails Snoring (Animated in Flash)
 Pigly (3D animation completed with Alias' Maya software)
 Much Ado About Ice Cream (2D animation)
 Shlub (2D animation)
 Polygon Family II (3D animation completed with Alias' Maya software)
 The Appointment (2D animation with digital color)
 Magical Trevor (2D animation)
 Nagymamma (Traditional animation)
 Rockfish (3D animation completed with Discreet's 3dsmax)
 The Tribe (Flash 2D animation)
 Bath Time (3D animation)
 Harold Rosenbaum Chartered Accountant Extreme: Ledger Boy Liquidation (Animated in Flash)
 Minue (2D animation)
 Ape Escape, Part III (CG animation)

Season 2 (The NEXTOONS: The Nicktoons Film Festival 2005)
This is the last season to use an unknown theme song for the show.
 La Révolution des Crabes (2D & 3D combo)
 Hobbies: Model Bus Collector (CG animation)
 Runaway Bathtub (Paper cut-out & stop-frame)
 Unmarked (3D animation)
 Those Scurvy Rascals (3D animation)
 Her Teddy Bear (Classic 2D animation)
 Blue Dress (CG animation)
 Man's First Friend (CG animation)
 Terrance Eats Knowledge (Hand-drawn & 2D digital animation)
 Up, Up & Away (CG animation)
 Like Pandas (Flash animation)
 Pen vs. Pencil (CG animation)
 Plumber (CG animation)
 Anthem (CG animation)
 Peeves: Toilet Water (Flash animation)
 Short Circuit (Hand-drawn animation)
 Soup (Stop-motion)
 A Sixty Second Tragedy (CG animation)
 The Naive Man from Lolliland (Hand-drawn, digitally composited; adapted into Regular Show)
 Tricks for a Treat (Hand-drawn animation)
 Prey (Hand-drawn animation)
 Chris Walker's Unfortunate Alphabet (Hand-drawn & CG-mixed)
 The Mousochist (Hand-drawn animation)
 First Kiss (Hand-drawn, digitally composited)
 Maestro (CG animation)
 The Gross Hunger (Hand-drawn animation)
 Getting Ice Cream (CG animation)
 Out of Beat (Paper cut-outs and digital animation)
 Mig Said... (Flash animation)
 Help! (CG animation)
 The Z-Files (Flash animation)
 The Monster Within (CG animation)
 To a Man with a Big Nose (2D and CG combo)
 Mille (CG animation)
 Over the Moon (Hand-drawn & CG combo)
 Anaka (CG animation)
 Oh, Dear! (Hand-drawn animation)
 A Short Visit to Toy Town (CG animation)
 Love Affair (Hand-drawn animation)
 Five Informercials for Dentists (Hand-drawn animation)
 Defective (CG animation)
 Betty (CG animation)
 Nulbur (Flash animation)
 In-Out (CG animation)
 The Laws of Gravity (Flash animation)
 The Life of a Mime (CG animation)
 Fee Fi Fo Fum (Digital cut-out)
 Sing-a-Long with Roosevelt (CG animation)
 Un-Doo (stop-motion)
 Egghunt (CG animation)
 Farm Force (2D animation)
 Project Firefly, created by Ethan Long and produced by Robin Cowie; aired on August 27, 2005

Season 3 (The Nicktoons Network Animation Festival 2006)
The 2006 Nicktoons Network Animation Festival aired on Nicktoons Saturday, August 26, 2006– Wednesday, August 30, 2006. Winners were announced on Thursday, August 31, 2006. This season introduced a new theme song for the show, titled "Walk tha Walk" by Andrew Philip Carroll and Nicholas Amour, replacing the unknown song.

 A Great Big Robot from Outer Space Ate My Homework (CGI animation)
 The Tale of How (2D CGI, Flash, Cutout)
 Great Apespectations (Traditional 2D)
 Handshake (Traditional animation)
 Bip Bip (Cutout)
 Dog Worries (Computer 2D)
 The Ballad of Sheep 13 (Classical 2D)
 Late Night Comedy (CGI animation)
 La Tete Dans les Nuages (The Head in the Clouds) (CGI animation)
 Super Scout (Traditional 2D; adapted into The Mighty B!)
 Libraryhead (Traditional 2D)
 Penguin Day Spa Commercial (CGI animation)
 Ballyvaughan Story (Traditional 2D)
 Doodle of Doom (Hand-Drawn, Flash)
 Juxtaposer (Traditional animation)
 Animation Test Pilot (CG)
 Engrish Bwudd (Stopmotion, 2D drawn, Pixelation; music video for "Engwish Bwudd" by Man Man)
 Abstract (Flash)
 Breakfast with The King (CG)
 The Mad Scientist Show: The Transporter (Flash)
 Giant's Kitchen (Traditional 2D)
 Crocodile Journals (Stopmotion)
 La Mia Migliore Amica (Flash)
 A Choreography with White-Fronted Geese, Horses, and a Locomotive (3D animation)
 Deep Six (Digital Flash)
 Eureka! (3D animation)
 Gorilla (Pencil on Paper)
 The New Guy (Flash)
 The M Man (Hand-Drawn)
 I Love You Kitty (Traditional 2D)
 The Sunshine (CG)
 Manege Frei (Flash)
 Egg Song (Flash)
 Zeitsprung Timetravels (3D)
 Exit (3D)
 Small and Deep, Love Stories (2D digital cutout and Hand-Drawn)
 The Passenger (3D)
 Sinking Margot (3D)
 The Moustache Contest (Flash)
 Snout (CG)
 Polka (Pencil on Paper)

Season 4 (2007)
 L’amie De Zoe (3D)
 Zoologic (3D animation) 
 Saalis (cut-outs)
 Soñadora (stop motion)
 Bare (pencil on paper, watercolor)
 Striped (Classical animation, colored in Photoshop, composited in After Effects)
 Hedgehug (2D computer, Flash)
 Hominid (Trad. 2D [brush and ink, digital ink and paint])
 Kiwi! (3D animation)
 Carried Away (3D computer)
 Monster on the Moon (Stop Motion, Cut-outs)
 José y Maria (Traditional animation [Hand-drawn])
 Angst (Mixed technique: pencil drawings/video/photo/3DFX)
 A Peach for the Teach (Traditional hand-drawn animation, colored on computer)
 Freewheel (Hand-drawn, water-colored, After Effects; music video for "Freewheel" by Duke Special)
 Cranks (3D computer)
 Feb-18-05 (drawing)
 Mortimer Pigmun and His Time Traveling Chums (stop motion)
 St. Laleeloo (2D traditional)
 Barfy the Pig in a Day in the Park (3D)
 Process Enacted (pixilation/stop-motion)
 Old Chestnut (2D animation, Adobe After Effects)
 Puppet (Hand-drawn, color/composite digitally)
 Zoologic (Hand-drawn animation or Traditional animation)
 After Oz (3D)
 The Little Dictator (2D computer)
 Think Like a Frog (Flash)
 Art's Desire (2D with 3D backgrounds)
 Loose Change (Computer animation)
 Insomnia (pastels on paper)

Season 5 (2008)
Nicktoons Network Animation Festival: 5th Year Animation Matters 
 Alien Abduction (3-D Animation)
 Once Upon a Tyme (3-D animation)
 Lilium Urbanus (3-D Animation)
 Red & Blue (3-D animation)
 Paper Cut (2-D Animation)
 Theatrum Comicum of Insects (2-D Animation)
 Boogie and Diggie (2-D Animation)
 The Adventures of Jane (2-D Flash Animation)
 Dive (3-D Animation)
 Mock and Boy'd: Get Out Of My Tree (2-D Animation)
 Getting Suspended (Sketching)
 Kid Show (Drawing Animation)
 Hal Mang (2-D Animation)
 The Matchbook (3-D Animation)
 La Lune (3-D animation)
 The Space Burger (2-D Animation)
 Galactic Adventure Quest in Space (2-D Animation)
 Henshin (3-D Animation)
 Sheep (Stop-Motion)
 Come Back Sweetheart (3-D Animation)
 Monster Movie (2-D Animation)
 El Mono (3-D Animation)
 Solar (3-D animation)
 Bathtime in Clerkenwell (2-D Animation)
 A Faery's Tale (3-D animation)
 Sticky the Stick (series) (2-D Flash Animation)
 Go Nuts Animation (2-D Animation)
 Pea on the Screws (Hand-Drawn 2-D animation)
 Pajama Gladiator (3-D Animation)

Season 6: Nickelodeon Animation Festival 2009
 Insert Coin Kina Sky Magic Theater Mariza No Quarter Oakley and Bud in 'Rogue UFO' Otis v. Monster Pencilmation #7: Malice in Wonderland Popped Shiny! So Close to the Sun Some Facts About Owls Squeak Tang The History of an Animation The History of Man Part 2 The Switch Tickle Me Silly Ultra Super Sudden Death Value Blind Vampirofaga At Deaths Door Barfy the Pig: Episode 6 Best Present Ever Cricket Deadline Divers Flying Boy Hubo Do Not Feed the Alligators2009 was the final season of the festival.

Legacy
Frederator Studios has persisted in the tradition of surfacing new talent, characters, and series in several ways, with The Nicktoons Film Festival being the first to present short cartoons recently produced by independent filmmakers around the world. This tradition has continued online with their Channel Frederator Network, the world's largest animation network, with over 3000 members who produce and program their own YouTube animation channels. Some of the most notable entries include To a Man with a Big Nose, Kiwi!, Kenya and Magical Trevor, Bathtime in Clerkenwell, the Ape Escape trilogy of shorts, The Naive from Loli Land, Charlie & Chunk, The Mouschist, Prey, Bert, Engrish Bwudd, Pigly, Libraryhead, Over the Moon, Feb-18-05, Late Night Comedy, Loco Melones, Rockfish, Super Scout and Welcome to My Life. Certain shorts featured here were also shown on YTV's Funpak.To a Man with a Big Nose was selected for the 2006 Fargo Film Festival in addition to being a Nicktoons Film Festival Entry, Kiwi! and both weebl's Kenya and Magical Trevor were considered major internet memes at that time, The Mouschist was created by Courage the Cowardly Dog creator John R. Dilworth, the Ape Escape trilogy of shorts promoted the games at the time, and the three were precursor shorts—Super Scout, The Naive from Loli Land and Welcome to My Life—would eventually become precursor to Nickelodeon's own The Mighty B! and both Cartoon Network's Regular Show and the latter's failed pilot of the same name.  Nicktoons Film Festival (or Nicktoons Network Animation Festival) Grand Jury judges included Genndy Tartakovsky (creator of Dexter's Laboratory and Samurai Jack), John Kricfalusi (creator of Ren & Stimpy), voice actor Patrick Warburton, veteran Disney animator Eric Goldberg, Mike Judge (creator of Beavis & Butthead and King of the Hill), David X. Cohen (writer, producer and showrunner for Futurama) and Steve Oedekerk (creator of Jimmy Neutron and Barnyard). Eric Fogel, who created Celebrity Deathmatch and Glenn Martin DDS for MTV and Nick at Nite, respectively, also created Charlie & Chunk exclusively for the show.

Simultaneously, Frederator has produced 250 original short cartoon films with several cartoon shorts "incubators," including (as of 2016): What A Cartoon! (Cartoon Network, 1995), Oh Yeah! Cartoons (Nickelodeon, 1998), The Meth Minute 39 (Channel Frederator, 2008), Random! Cartoons (Nickelodeon/Nicktoons, 2008), Too Cool! Cartoons (Cartoon Hangover, 2012), and GO! Cartoons (Cartoon Hangover, 2016). These laboratories have spun off notable series like: Dexter's Laboratory, The Powerpuff Girls, Johnny Bravo, Cow & Chicken, Courage the Cowardly Dog, Larry & Steve (which was the basis for Family Guy), Kenny and the Chimp (which was the basis for Codename: Kids Next Door), Grim & Evil (which was split into Evil Con Carne and The Grim Adventures of Billy & Mandy), The Fairly OddParents, My Life as a Teenage Robot, ChalkZone, Nite Fite, Fanboy & Chum Chum, Adventure Time, Bravest Warriors, Rocket Dog, and Bee and PuppyCat.

See alsoSpike and Mike's Festival of AnimationLiquid TelevisionDisney's Raw ToonageWhat a Cartoon!KaBlam!Cartoon SushiOh Yeah! CartoonsExposureEye DropsThe Animation ShowFunpakAnimation Block PartyVH1 ILL-ustratedShorty McShorts' ShortsWedgiesRandom CartoonsSeth MacFarlane's Cavalcade of Cartoon ComedyThe CartoonstituteOff the AirNickelodeon Animated Shorts ProgramToo Cool! CartoonsCartoon Network Shorts DepartmentTripTankDisney XD ShortstopGo! CartoonsLove, Death & Robots''

References

External links
 

2000s American animated television series
2000s American anthology television series
American children's animated anthology television series
Nicktoons (TV network) original programming
Frederator Studios
Animation film festivals in the United States
Film competitions
Short film festivals in the United States
Children's film festivals in the United States
Film festivals established in 2004
2004 American television series debuts
2009 American television series endings
Recurring events established in 2004
Recurring events disestablished in 2009